Manuel Agustín Falón (born 5 July 1995) is an Argentine professional footballer who plays as a midfielder for Sacachispas.

Career
Falón's career began in 2017 with Argentine Primera División side Huracán. He made his senior debut during the 2016–17 Argentine Primera División campaign, coming on as a substitute for Mariano González in a defeat to Independiente on 20 May 2017. He terminated his contract in June 2018 due to problems with the club and in his personal life; his deal was due to run until 2020. After a year out of the game travelling, Falón completed a move to Sacachispas of Primera B Metropolitana in July 2019. His first appearance came on 3 August versus UAI Urquiza, he then scored his first senior goal against Almirante Brown on 24 August.

Career statistics
.

References

External links

1995 births
Living people
Footballers from Buenos Aires
Argentine footballers
Association football midfielders
Argentine Primera División players
Primera B Metropolitana players
Club Atlético Huracán footballers
Sacachispas Fútbol Club players